The following is a list of the butterflies of India. 

India has extremely diverse terrain, climate and vegetation, which comprises extremes of heat cold, desert and jungle, of low-lying plains and the highest mountains, of dryness and dampness, islands and continental areas, widely varying flora, and sharply marked seasons. India forms a large part of the Indomalayan biogeographical zone; many of the floral and faunal forms show Malayan affinities with some taxa being unique to the Indian region. In addition, India hosts three of the world's biodiversity hotspots: the Western Ghats, the Eastern Himalayas, and the hilly ranges bordering India and Myanmar, each having numerous endemic species. Accordingly, India's diverse and varied fauna include a rich variety of butterflies and moths. Brigadier William Harry Evans  recorded approximately 1439 species of butterfly from British India, including Ceylon and Burma. After 1947, the rise of several new nations led to a reduction of the area forming part of India proper, and the number of species has been noted to be an estimated 1318 species.

Per-family lists

Six families of butterflies are represented in India.
The quoted numbers of species per family are likely to evolve as a result of advances in taxonomy and in the collection of data regarding occurrence and distribution.

 Papilionidae - swallowtail butterflies (84 species)
 Hesperiidae - skipper butterflies (277 species)
 Coeliadinae (22 species)
 Pyrginae (51 species)
 Hesperiinae (133 species)
 Heteropterinae (1 species)
 Pieridae - yellow and white butterflies (81 species)
 Riodinidae - punches & judies (16 species)
 Lycaenidae - blues, hairstreaks and gossamer-winged butterflies (318 species)
 Nymphalidae - brush-footed butterflies (439 species)
 Danainae (26 species)
 Morphinae (20 species)
 Satyrinae (176 species)
 Limenitidinae (99 species)
 Libytheinae (3 species)
 Charaxinae (16 species)
 Calinaginae (3 species)
 Heliconiinae (27 species)
 Cyrestinae (10 species)
 Pseudergolinae (1 species)
 Biblidinae (4 species)
 Apaturinae (17 species)
 Nymphalinae (37 species)

Per-state lists
India has 28 states and 8 union territories. The list of butterflies for each state can be found using the index below:

States
 Andhra Pradesh
 Arunachal Pradesh
 Assam
 Bihar
 Chhattisgarh
 Goa
 Gujarat
 Haryana
 Himachal Pradesh
 Jammu and Kashmir
 Jharkhand
 Karnataka
 Kerala
 Madhya Pradesh
 Maharashtra
 Manipur
 Meghalaya
 Mizoram
 Nagaland
 Odisha
 Punjab
 Rajasthan
 Sikkim
 Tamil Nadu
 Telangana
 Tripura
 Uttar Pradesh
 Uttarakhand
 West Bengal

Union territories:
 Andaman and Nicobar Islands
 Chandigarh
 Dadra and Nagar Haveli
 Daman and Diu
 Lakshadweep
 Delhi
 Pondicherry

See also
 Butterfly
 Fauna of India
 List of butterflies of the Western Ghats

References

Other sources

Kehimkar, I. (2008) The Book of Indian Butterflies. Bombay Natural History Society and Oxford University Press, Mumbai, India.

External links
 Butterflies of Meghalaya
 Oriental Nymphalidae
 Butterfly taxonomy
 
 Indian Wildlife Act and scheduled species lists
 Schedule 1
 Schedule 2
 Butterflies of India

 01
.B
Lists of fauna of India